Thiembronne is a commune in the Pas-de-Calais department in the Hauts-de-France region of France.

Geography
Thiembronne is located 15 miles (24 km) southwest of Saint-Omer, on the D158 and D132 road junction.

Population

Places of interest
 The church of Saint Pierre, dating from the nineteenth century.
 The nineteenth-century château.
 The remains of the medieval château, destroyed in 1595.

See also
 Communes of the Pas-de-Calais department

References

Communes of Pas-de-Calais